Chris Duffey (born September 3, 1974) is an American author, AI & mobile technologist and Adobe's creative director, known for development of the creative enterprise space at Adobe, and for writing Superhuman Innovation: Transforming Business with Artificial Intelligence, which was "co-authored" by an artificial intelligence called Aimé.

Early life 
Duffey was born to John and Diane Duffey in Milwaukee, Wisconsin. His mother is an elementary school teacher, his father, a reading specialist. Duffey described himself as being interested in the fusion of human creativity and technology from a very young age.

Career 
Duffey started his career as a content creator and designer of digital customer experiences, observing human interaction with artificial intelligence and the ability of AI to amplify human creativity. He worked for several years in the 2010s for healthcare communications network Sudler & Hennessey, eventually becoming a senior vice president and group creative director.

Duffey has been a creative consultant with more than thirty-five advertising agencies serving major global marketing holding companies including WPP, IPG, Havas, Publicis and MDC. , he led the strategic development department at Adobe. He has been featured by Business Insider and Yahoo as one of "The industry's leaders on the top issues, challenges, and opportunities in the fast-changing world of mobile".

Public speaking 
Duffey is a five-time Cannes Lions speaker. In 2017, he spoke at Cannes Innovation about Artificial Intelligence Enhanced Creativity. He has also shared the stage with Kim Kardashian at Cannes Lions on How To Connect With Audiences Through Mobile Gaming. Also that year, he extolled the use of chatbots as a means of disseminating information between stakeholders in healthcare, in an interview with PharmaVoice.

In 2018, he co-presented with Microsoft on the role of Human and Machine, and in 2019, he spoke with IBM on the future of Cognitive Creativity.

Publications 

Duffey has written on the increasing relevance of AI & mobile, particularly in designing experiences for the health, wellness and fitness space. In 2014, The Guardian named his piece, "How Mobile Became Mighty in Healthcare", to their Top Ten Best Healthcare Stories of the Year, and in 2019 Remedy Health Media and New York City Health Business Leaders chose Duffey to receive their Boldest Digital Health Influencer Agency Guru Award.

Also in 2019, Duffey published Superhuman Innovation: Transforming Business with Artificial Intelligence, where he provides his insights about human interaction with artificial intelligence. The book was co-authored by artificial intelligence, Aimé. Superhuman Innovation: Transforming Business with Artificial Intelligence was selected as CES 2020 Top Technology Book of the Year, the world's largest business of consumer technologies conference. TechRepublic named the book as one of their "45 books every techie should read".

His work has been featured by platforms such as Google, McKinsey, and Wharton15 in their digital marketing books.

References

External links
Smartwatches will revolutionise treatment for chronic conditions, The Guardian (July 25, 2014)
Ignore the science fiction: AI isn't out to get us, The Spectator (February 23, 2019)

1974 births
Living people
People from Milwaukee
21st-century American non-fiction writers